The Utilite is a small, fanless nettop computer manufactured by the Israeli company CompuLab. It was announced in July 2013 and is based upon the Freescale i.MX6 SoC.

It is available in Utilite Value, Utilite Standard and Utilite Pro models.

The Utilite is delivered with:

 Ubuntu 12.04 (soft-float or armel version) pre-installed.

Other available operating systems:

 Android 4.x
 Arch Linux ARM (hard-float or armhf version)
 Gentoo Linux source based distribution
 Kali Linux (armhf Debian 7 based - focused on security testing)

There exists also three Linux based operating systems specialized on media playback:

 XBMC
 GeeXbox 
 Volumio (armhf Debian 7 based)

Both the Bootloader (U-Boot) and the Kernel are Open Source
and can be found on Gitorious and GitHub.

See also
 Industrial PC

References

External links
 
 Github 

Computer-related introductions in 2013
Linux-based devices
Computers and the environment
Nettop